Julián de Meriche (born Vladimir Lipkies Chazan; 10 october 1910 – 27 July 1974) was a Russian Empire-born Mexican film actor and choreographer.

De Meriche worked as a dancer in European music halls, then moved to Argentina where he worked in cinema in the 1930s. He moved to Mexico and participated by portraying supporting roles in many films from the 1940s until his death, often playing foreigners. De Meriche also worked as an actor and director in many stages, TV, cabaret performances. Known for his villainous roles and raspy voice, he was married to María Elena Velasco "La India María". Their children are producer-director Iván Lipkies, writer-actress Goretti Lipkies, and writer-producer Ivette Lipkies.

References

External links
 

Mexican male film actors
1910 births
1974 deaths
20th-century Mexican male actors
Mexican directors
Mexican people of Russian descent
Soviet emigrants to Argentina
Argentine emigrants to Mexico